East Greenbush is the name the following places in the United States of America:

East Greenbush (CDP), New York
East Greenbush (town), New York